Nisachon Tuamsoongnuen  (born April 24, 1993 in Thailand), nickname May, is a Thai actress and model.

Life 
Nisachon was born on April 24, 1993, born in Udon Thani, Thailand. She is a beauty actress. Miss Thailand World And she got the position Good shape beauty queen She received a prize of 100,000 baht with a shoulder strap and a Gold VIP Card worth 100,000 baht.

And in the contest Miss Thailand World 2014 has served as an invitation to a special prize in the contest. By inviting the prize together with 2 other people from the winner of the special prize from the stage Miss Thailand World 2013

Currently, Moe has signed a contract as an actor within Thai Color TV Channel 3, since 2013. Currently, Nisachon Nisachon graduated high school at St. Mary's School. Before receiving the fund of the exchange program Go to study in grade 6 in the United States And higher education at studying at Faculty of Communication Arts Rangsit University

Career 
Nisachon began to enter the industry from the contest. Miss Thailand World 2013 with special awards And went to cast the drama channel 3, the first drama she performed was Khun Chai Ruk Leh

The drama that made her known is Krong Kam, which played the role of Bang-On.

Filmography

Film

Television series

Mc 
 Announcer Thai TV Color Channel 3

Music

Ost. 
 2014 Thida Dance (ธิดาแดนซ์ (Together With Gaewalin Sriwanna, Rakchon Puttarangsi)) - Thida Dance (ธิดาแดนซ์)
 2014  (ทิ้งกันละน่าดู) - Thida Dance (ธิดาแดนซ์)

Award 
 Beauty queen is good from the stage Miss Thailand World 2013

References

External links 
    

1993 births
Living people
Nisachon Tuamsoongnuen
Nisachon Tuamsoongnuen
Nisachon Tuamsoongnuen
Nisachon Tuamsoongnuen
Nisachon Tuamsoongnuen
Nisachon Tuamsoongnuen
Nisachon Tuamsoongnuen